The United States House of Representatives elections in California, 1868 were elections for California's delegation to the United States House of Representatives, which occurred as part of the general election of the House of Representatives on November 3, 1868. California's delegation remained at two Democrats and one Republican.

Results

District 1

District 2

District 3

See also 
41st United States Congress
Political party strength in California
Political party strength in U.S. states
United States House of Representatives elections, 1868

References 
California Elections Page
Office of the Clerk of the House of Representatives

External links 
California Legislative District Maps (1911-Present)
RAND California Election Returns: District Definitions

1868
California
United States House of Representatives